Museum für Völkerkunde or Völkerkundemuseum may refer to:

Museum of Ethnology Dresden
Museum Five Continents, Munich (formerly known as State Museum of Ethnology)
Museum of Ethnology, Hamburg
Museum of Ethnology, Vienna
Ethnological Museum of Berlin